Elipsocus pusillus is a species of Psocoptera from the Elipsocidae family that is endemic to Cyprus.

References

Elipsocidae
Insects described in 1996
Endemic arthropods of Cyprus
Psocoptera of Europe